Aust-Agder was a county (fylke) in Norway until 1 January 2020, when it was merged with Vest-Agder to form Agder county. In 2002, there were 102,945 inhabitants, which was 2.2% of Norway's population. The county's administrative center was the town of Arendal.

The county, located along the Skagerrak coast, extended from Gjernestangen at Risør to the Kvåsefjorden in Lillesand. The inner parts of the area included Setesdalsheiene and  Austheiene. Most of the population lives near the coast; about 78% of the county's inhabitants live in the five coastal municipalities of Arendal, Grimstad, Lillesand, Tvedestrand, and Risør. The rest of the county is sparsely populated. Tourism is important, as Arendal and the other coastal towns are popular attractions.

The county includes the larger islands of Tromøya, Hisøya, Justøya, and Sandøya. The interior of the county encompasses the traditional district of Setesdal, through which the river Otra flows to the coast.

In 2017, the Parliament of Norway voted to merge Aust-Agder and Vest-Agder counties into one large region, Agder, effective 1 January 2020.

The county was part of the Aust-Agder District Court and the Church of Norway Diocese of Agder og Telemark.

Name

The meaning of the name is "(the) eastern (part of) Agder", since the word aust is the Nynorsk form of "east". 

Until 1919, the name of the county was Nedenes amt. The amt was named after the old Nedenes farm (Norse Niðarnes), since this was the seat of the amtmann (County Governor).  The first element is the genitive case of the river name Nið (now  called Nidelva) and the last element is nes which means "headland".  The meaning of the river name is unknown.

Coat-of-arms
The coat-of-arms is from modern times.  They were granted on 12 December 1958.  It shows two horizontal golden bars on a red background.  They symbolize the lumber trade and the recovery of iron ore that was important for Aust-Agder's growth.  There are two bars to represent the two areas of the county: inland and coastal.

Municipalities

The system of municipalities, or kommuner, was established in Norway in 1837, based on previously existing parishes (see formannskapsdistrikt). Norway had been ceded to Sweden by Denmark in 1814, at which it promptly rebelled and won the right of self-rule, though nominally part of Sweden. In 1905, Norway declared total independence. Meanwhile, as the years progressed, the municipalities did not remain the same, but new ones were formed, old ones broken up, and land was transferred.  Since the 1990s, Aust-Agder has been divided into 15 municipalities:

Cities

 Arendal
 Grimstad
 Risør
 Lillesand
 Tvedestrand

Parishes

 Arendal
 Austad
 Austre Moland
 Barbu
 Birkenes
 Bjorbekk
 Bygland
 Bykle
 Old Bykle
 Dypvåg
 Eide
 Engene
 Evje
 Færvik
 Fevik
 Fjære
 Fjellgardane
 Flosta
 Froland
 Frydendal
 Gjerstad
 Gjøvdal
 Grimstad
 Grøvdal, see Gjøvdal
 Herefoss
 Hisøy
 Holt
 Hommedal
 Hornnes
 Hylestad
 Høvåg
 Iveland
 Justøy
 Laget
 Landvik
 Lillesand
 Mykland
 Risør
 Sandnes
 Stokken
 Søndeled (Sønneløv)
 Tovdal
 Trefoldighet (Trinity)
 Tromøy
 Tvedestrand
 Valle
 Vegusdal
 Vegårshei
 Vestre Moland
 Østerhus
 Østre Moland, see Austre Moland
 Øyestad
 Åmli
 Årdal
 Arendal Branch (LDS, 1864-1914)
 Arendal Lutherske Frimenighet (1884-1908)
 Arendal (Den Katolske Apostoliske, 1889-1928)
 Arendal Metodistkirke (1868-1892)
 Risør Branch (LDS, 1851-1866)
 Risør Lutheran Frikirke, (1877-1995)
 Tvedestrand Baptist Menighet (1892-1895)

Villages

 Akland
 Asdal
 Askerøya
 Askland
 Ausland
 Austad
 Bakken
 Berdalen
 Besteland
 Birkeland
 Birketveit
 Bjorbekk
 Bjåen
 Blakstad
 Borås
 Bossvika
 Bossvika
 Breive
 Brekka
 Brekkestø
 Brokke
 Bygland
 Byglandsfjord
 Bykle
 Bøylefoss
 Bøylestad
 Dypvåg
 Dølemo
 Dåsnesmoen
 Eikeland
 Engesland
 Eppeland
 Espenes
 Evje
 Evjemoen
 Eydehavn
 Fevik
 Fiane, Gjerstad
 Fiane, Tvedestrand
 Fie
 Flakk
 Flatebygd
 Flaten
 Froland
 Frolands verk
 Færvik
 Gautestad
 Gjennestad
 Gjerstad
 Gjeving
 Goderstad
 Grendi
 Gryting
 Grønland
 Heldalsmo
 Helldal
 Herefoss
 Hesnes
 Hillestad (Tovdal)
 Hinebu
 His (Hisøy)
 Holmsund
 Homborsund
 Homdrom
 Homme
 Hornnes
 Hoslemo
 Hovden
 Hovet
 Hynnekleiv
 Hødnebø
 Høvåg
 Håbbesland
 Håbbestad
 Jomås
 Jortveit
 Kalvøysund
 Kilen
 Kilsund
 Kjetså
 Klåholmen
 Kolbjørnsvik
 Kongshamn
 Krabbesund
 Kroken
 Kråkvåg
 Laget
 Langeid
 Lauvdal
 Lauveik
 Lauvrak
 Libru
 Lindtveit
 Litveit
 Longerak
 Longum
 Lyngør
 Løddesøl
 Løvjomås
 Merdø
 Mjølhus
 Mjåvatn
 Mo
 Moen
 Moi
 Mollestad
 Mykland
 Myra
 Narestø
 Nedenes
 Nelaug
 Nesgrenda
 Nipe
 Nordbygdi
 Nygrenda
 Nævesdal
 Oggevatn
 Ose
 Osedalen
 Pusnes
 Reddal
 Revesand
 Ribe
 Risdal
 Rise
 Roresand
 Rugsland
 Rygnestad
 Rykene
 Rysstad
 Rød, Arendal
 Rød, Gjerstad
 Rønnes
 Røysland
 Sagene
 Sagesund
 Saltrød
 Sandnes, Bygland
 Sandnes, Risør
 Sandvika (Borøy)
 Sennumstad
 Sivik
 Skaiå
 Skåmedal
 Skiftenes
 Skjeggedal
 Songe
 Staubø
 Stoa
 Strengereid
 Sundebru
 Svaland
 Søndeled
 Søre Herefoss
 Tjore
 Trøe
 Tveide
 Tveit
 Ubergsmoen
 Ulvøysund
 Uppstad
 Valle
 Vatnebu
 Vatnestrøm
 Vehus
 Vesterhus
 Vestøl
 Vik
 Vrengen
 Væting
 Ytre Ramse
 Østerholt
 Østerhus
 Østerå
 Øvre Dåsvatn
 Øvre Ramse
 Øyna
 Åkerøyhamn
 Åmdalsøyra
 Åmli
 Åneland
 Åraksbø
 Ås

Former Municipalities

 Austre Moland
 Barbu
 Dypvåg
 Eide
 Evje
 Evje og Vegusdal
 Fjære
 Flosta
 Gjøvdal
 Herefoss
 Hisøy
 Holt
 Hornnes
 Hornnes og Iveland
 Hylestad
 Høvåg
 Landvik
 Moland
 Mykland
 Stokken
 Søndeled
 Tovdal
 Tromøy
 Vegusdal
 Vestre Moland
 Øyestad

Population

Since the census of 1769, Aust-Agder has experienced a steady population growth: from 29,633 to 79,927 in 1900, and to 102,848 in 2001. There was significant emigration to the United States in the 19th century and early 20th century.

See also
Vest-Agder
Sørlandet
Agder

References

External links
Political map
Aust-Agder fylkeskommune (in English)
Photogallery
 
 

 
Former counties of Norway
2020 disestablishments in Norway
States and territories disestablished in 2020